The 1942 Western Reserve Red Cats football team represented the Western Reserve University, now known as Case Western Reserve University, during the 1942 college football season. The team was coached by Tom Davies, assisted by Dick Luther until he was called to the U.S. Navy early in the season.

Schedule

References

Western Reserve
Case Western Reserve Spartans football seasons
Western Reserve Red Cats football